Thomas Smyth, Thomas Smythe or Tommy Smyth may refer to:
Thomas Smythe (customer) (1522–1591), collector of customs duties ("customer") in London during the Tudor period.
Sir Thomas Smythe (1558–1625), English entrepreneur
Thomas Smyth (bishop) (1650–1725), Irish bishop
Sir Thomas Smyth, 2nd Baronet (after 1657–1732), Irish politician
Thomas Smyth (Archdeacon of Glendalough) (fl. 1723–1751), Irish Anglican priest
Thomas Smyth (Limerick MP) (1740–1785), Irish politician
Thomas Smyth (merchant) (1737–1824), English merchant, banker and Lord Mayor of Liverpool
Thomas Smyth (Archdeacon of Lismore) (fl. 1788–1826), Irish Anglican priest
Thomas Alfred Smyth (1832–1865), major general in the Union Army during the American Civil War
Tommy Smyth (rugby union) (1884–1928), Irish international rugby union prop forward
Thomas Smyth (Irish nationalist politician) (1875–1937), Member of Parliament for South Leitrim, 1906–1918
Tommy Smyth (born 1946), Irish-American soccer commentator

See also
Thomas Smythe (disambiguation)
Thomas Smith (disambiguation)
Tom Smith (disambiguation)
Tommy Smith (disambiguation)